Jacob Punnoose was the Director General of Police (DGP) of Kerala and the State Police Chief. He retired on 31 August 2012 after serving more than 35 years in the Indian Police Service and in Kerala Police. He was succeeded by Sri K.S.Balasubramanian IPS as the State Police Chief on 1 September 2012. He has often been accused of being close to the Kannur lobby within the Communist Party of India (Marxist).

On 31 January 2018 he became Executive Director of Pushpagiri Medical College. He is Secretary of the Pastoral Council in the Major Archieparchy of Trivandrum.

Education 
He had his education in Government U.P.S. Thekkekkara (Mavelikara), P C High School (Ranni), S C High School (Ranni), St. Xavier's College, Thumba (Trivandrum), University  College (Trivandrum) and Cochin University.

Career 
He became the City Police Commissioner of Trivandrum and Kozhikode, Joint Excise Commissioner, Zonal IG of Trivandrum and Kozhikode, Intelligence IG, Additional DGP (Training) and Intelligence DGP. He was the Vigilance Director. He was the chairman Kerala Police Act Review Committee. He was appointed DGP of law and order in Kerala on 26 November 2008. He was a member of 1975 IPS Batch.

Personal life 
He belongs to the Kurudamannil family. His parents are K.C. Punnoose and Annamma.Prof. Rebecca Msc. Mphil.  is his wife. The couple have two children: Punnoose Jacob and Thomas Jacob.

References

Syro-Malankara Catholics
Year of birth missing (living people)
Living people
Indian police officers
Indian civil servants
Kerala Police officers
Civil Servants from Kerala